Graham Kitchener (born 29 September 1989 in Bromley) is an English rugby union player.  His position is lock.

He has represented England at Under 16, 18 and Under 20 level, and played a part in the Under 20s 6 nations grand slam in 2008.  He was also a crucial member of the 2009 Under 20 squad, reaching the final of the JWC.

Kitchener attended Adams' Grammar School in Newport like fellow professional rugby player Peter Short of Bath Rugby.

A talented all round athlete, he spent 3 years playing football for Wolverhampton Wanderers Academy before deciding to focus on rugby. He was a schoolboy cricketer for Shropshire and was the Midlands Under 17 Shot Put champion, before finishing 6th in the English Schools championships. He combines his commitments as a professional rugby player with a full-time degree at University of Birmingham

A graduate of the academy system at Aviva Premiership club Worcester Warriors, Graham Kitchener left the Warriors to join Leicester Tigers for the 2011-12 season. Kitchener started the 2013 Premiership final and scored a try as Leicester defeated Northampton Saints. 

He played for the England Saxons through 2011, including their successful Churchill Cup campaign.

Kitchener was selected for the England squad to face the Barbarians in the summer of 2014.

He was called up to the senior England squad for the 2015 Six Nations Championship.

On 4 February 2019, Graham would re-sign for his old club Worcester Warriors, effectively leaving Leicester from the 2019-20 season.

On 5 October 2022 all Worcester players had their contacts terminated due to the liquidation of the company to which they were contracted.

References

External links
Worcester Warriors profile
England profile
Guinness Premiership profile
Leicester Tigers Profile

1989 births
Living people
English rugby union players
Leicester Tigers players
Worcester Warriors players
Rugby union locks
People educated at Adams' Grammar School
Alumni of the University of Birmingham
Rugby union players from Bromley